Lincoln Street Historic District may refer to:

 Allen Place–Lincoln Street Historic District, listed on the NRHP in Hartford, Connecticut
 Lincoln Street Historic District (Gary, Indiana)
 Lincoln Street Historic District (Brunswick, Maine), listed on the NRHP in Cumberland County, Maine
 Lincoln Street Historic District (Oregon, Wisconsin), listed on the NRHP in Oregon, Wisconsin

See also
Lincoln Street Electric Streetlights, Twin Falls, Idaho, listed on the NRHP in Twin Falls County, Idaho